James Arthur Hazewinkel (born September 8, 1944) is an American former wrestler who competed in the 1968 Summer Olympics and in the 1972 Summer Olympics. Born in Detroit, Michigan, he is the twin brother of David Hazewinkel and uncle of Sam Hazewinkel.

References

1944 births
Living people
Sportspeople from Detroit
Olympic wrestlers of the United States
Wrestlers at the 1968 Summer Olympics
Wrestlers at the 1972 Summer Olympics
American male sport wrestlers
Twin sportspeople
American twins